The Space Programme 2040 is a satellite development and launch programme of the Space and Upper Atmosphere Research Commission (Suparco), Pakistan's space research authority. The Space programme 2040 intends to replace the Badr satellite programme and geo-stationary communication satellite. On 11 August 2011, Paksat-IR was launched from Xichang Satellite Launch Center by China, making it first satellite to be launched under this programme. According to Suparco, five GEO satellites and six low Earth orbit (LEO) satellites will be launched between 2011 and 2040.

The stated goals of the program are expected to gain significant experience in satellite development, practising of space medicine, and to promote socio-economic sector in the country. While the programme intends to learn to develop the military and space technologies and to conduct experiments on fundamental sciences in space frontier, the government maintained that Space programme-2040's prime purpose is to bring the benefits of the full spectrum of space technology to the people of Pakistan. On 15 July 2011, Prime minister Yousaf Gillani gave official approval of the programme with the 2011 Pakistan fiscal year budget.

Low Earth orbit 

In 1992, Suparco launched its first LEO project, and it was completed in 1996. Badr-II was Suparco's first LEO satellite and was launched in 2001 from Baikonur Cosmodrome by the Russian Space Agency. Since then, Suparco took initiatives to replace its first Suparco satellite, therefore, Remote Sensing Satellite programme in January 2007.

Remote Sensing Satellite
Suparco planned to launch its first optical satellite in the end of 2011 from People's Republic of China. The satellite is reported to have payload of 2.5 meter PAN in 700 km in SSO. It is the first satellite that is locally manufactured by the Suparco and to meet the national and international user requirements in the field of satellite imagery.

Remote Sensing Programme

There are six remote sensing satellites expected to be developed and launched under this programme. Suparco is intending to launch its first remote sensing satellite in 2018 and it is named as PRSS-O1. According to Suparco, the planned and manufactured satellites are list below:

PRSS-O1
PRSS-S1
PRSS-O2
PRSS-S2
PRSS-O3
PRSS-S3

Geostationary orbit 

The Space Programme 2040 included the development of five GEO satellites and six LEO satellites to replace Suparco's existing satellites in the orbit. There are no plans for development of a Launch vehicle, and the programme is entirely intended to launch more communication and remote sensing satellites from other countries. On 11 August, the Suparco launched the Paksat-IR, as first satellite as part of this programme.

Geo-satellites

According to Suparco, the Space Programme intends to launch five GEO satellites from 2011 till 2040. Here the details are given:

Paksat-IE
The Paksat-IE was country's first GEO satellite that was operated by the Suparco. Previously owned by Boeing and operated under lease by Paksat. It was launched on 31 January 1996 and leased to Suparco in 2003. Since then, Suparco initiated to develop its own GEO satellite programme, financed by People's Republic of China. The satellite will be replaced by its advanced and upgrade satellite, the Paksat-IR.

Paksat-IR

The Paksat-IR is a first GEO satellite that was launched at 21:17hrs 11 August as part of this programme from People's Republic of China. Its satellite vehicle was the Long March 3E carrier rocket from the Xichang Satellite Launch Centre in China's Sichuan province. The China Aerospace Science and Technology Corporation and the Suparco was the main contractor to build Paksat-IR, and DESTO was selected to build the primary heat shield and electronic materials for the spacecraft. The Paksat-IR objectives are to support all conventional and modern Fixed Satellite Service (FSS) applications, with a total of 30 Communication Transponders (12 in C band and 18 in Ku band).

The GEO satellites that are under development or proposed are listed below:
Paksat-MM1
Paksat-MM2
Paksat-II

References

Space programme of Pakistan
Science and technology in Pakistan
2040 in science
Government of Yousaf Raza Gillani
Policies of Pakistan